Salem Abdullah Awadh Saeed (born 1 January 1984) is a Yemeni international footballer who plays for Al-Ahli Club Sana'a as a goalkeeper.

Career
Saeed has played club football in Yemen and Oman for Hassan Abyan, Al-Nasr, Al-Hilal Al-Sahili, Al-Mussanah, Al-Wehda Club and Al-Ahli Club Sana'a.

He made his international debut for Yemen in 2007, and has appeared for them in FIFA World Cup qualifying matches.

References

1984 births
Living people
Yemeni footballers
Association football goalkeepers
Hassan Abyan players
Al-Nasr SC (Salalah) players
Al-Hilal Al-Sahili players
Al-Musannah SC players
Al-Wehda Club (Sana'a) players
Al-Ahli Club Sana'a players
Yemeni League players
Oman Professional League players
Yemen international footballers
Yemeni expatriate footballers
Yemeni expatriate sportspeople in Oman
Expatriate footballers in Oman